J. Denis Bélisle is a Canadian former diplomat. He was concurrently appointed as Ambassador Extraordinary and Plenipotentiary to Burkina Faso, Ivory Coast, Mali and Niger between 1991 and 1994. He also served as the Executive Director of the International Trade Centre from 1994 to 2006.

External links 
 Foreign Affairs and International Trade Canada Complete List of Posts 

Year of birth missing (living people)
Living people
Ambassadors of Canada to Burkina Faso
Ambassadors of Canada to Ivory Coast
Ambassadors of Canada to Mali
Ambassadors of Canada to Niger